Choir of Echoes is the third studio album by British band Peggy Sue. It was released in January 2014 under Yep Roc Records.

Track list

References

2014 albums